A rafiot is a fishing vessel, traditionally from the Mediterranean coast of France, and in particular Toulon.

In French, the term has come to pejoratively describe a vessel in poor shape.

Types of fishing vessels
Nautical terminology